The Dutch Society for Botanical Artists (Vereniging van Botanisch Kunstenaars Nederland), further referred to as “VBKN”, is the Dutch society which brings together botanical artists and is dedicated to enhancing the quality of work and to promoting the public awareness of botanical illustration in the Netherlands. The society honors the tradition of botanical art and aims at furthering its development. It organizes many exhibitions, workshops, master classes, lectures, annual excursions, maintains contact with other international societies for botanical artists and brings the work of the members to the public attention. The VBKN was established on the 12th of April 2006 by Jacomien van Andel, Ria van Elk, Margriet Honingh, Hanneke Jelles, Sigrid Frensen, Jan van Os and Anita Walsmit Sachs. With already a 150 members in 2011, the society celebrated its 5th anniversary.

See also
 Botanical illustrator
 Hortus Botanicus Leiden
 Leiden University
 Naturalis

References

External links
 

Clubs and societies in the Netherlands
Arts organizations established in 2006
Dutch artist groups and collectives
Botanical societies

2006 establishments in the Netherlands